The 1940 Tennessee gubernatorial election was held on November 5, 1940. Incumbent Democrat Prentice Cooper defeated Republican nominee C. Arthur Bruce with 72.09% of the vote.

General election

Candidates
Prentice Cooper, Democratic
C. Arthur Bruce, Republican

Results

References

1940
Tennessee
Gubernatorial